KOAI (95.1 FM) is a commercial radio station, licensed to Sun City West, Arizona, and serving the Phoenix metropolitan area. The station is owned by Riviera Broadcasting, an subsidiary of the Yucaipa Companies.  It broadcasts an oldies and classic hits radio format, featuring mostly hits from the 1960s, 70s and 80s.  It primarily competes with Audacy-owned 94.5 KOOL-FM, which concentrates on 1980s hits, with some 70s and 90s titles.

KOAI has an effective radiated power (ERP) of 41,000 watts.  The transmitter is in Crown King, Arizona, about 50 miles northwest of Phoenix, giving KOAI a rimshot signal in the metro area.  Programming is also heard on 250-watt FM translator 94.9 K235CB in Chandler.  The translator is fed by 103.9 KZON-HD2.  The studios and offices are on 7th Street in Midtown Phoenix.

History
95.1 went on the air in 1996, licensed to Winslow, broadcasting from Mingus Mountain and covering areas of Northern Arizona. It was owned by Ted Tucker's Desert West Air Ranchers Corporation. Tucker moved the station in 2000 to the Crown King site (along with a change of city of license to Mayer, later changed again to Sun City West).  It was sold in 2004 to Sun City Communications for $18.7 million. The new ownership flipped KFMR from a simulcast of Tucker's KCDX to the Hispanic rhythmic ("hurban") format as KVIB "The Vibe". As The Vibe, KVIB played a youth-oriented radio format playing both Spanish-language and English-language pop. The station's mix of music targeted the Valley's burgeoning young Latino population, particularly long-time residents who can speak English but prefer Spanish.

On January 23, 2014, KVIB changed its format to Spanish language adult contemporary, branded as "Solamente Éxitos" with a bilingual presentation.

On August 13, 2014, at noon, 95.1 flipped to Soft Adult Contemporary as 95.1 The Oasis, and nine days later, the station changed its call sign to KOAI. The last song of the Spanish AC format was "Royals" by Lorde with the first song on The Oasis being Cool Change by the Little River Band. The station played a Christmas music format for the 2014 holiday season, the second station in Phoenix after KESZ.

On April 9, 2015, 95.1 gained an FM translator, K235CB 94.9 on South Mountain, (licensed to Chandler), and also began simulcasting on the HD2 digital subchannel of KEXX.

In May 2015, KOAI adjusted its playlist to include more uptempo selections from the 1990s through the present time, while still retaining a gold/soft AC-lean.

On June 5, 2015, while it was still a soft AC station, KOAI picked up Delilah's syndicated evening radio show. Delilah continued on the station through two additional format changes, first to a mainstream adult contemporary station, and then to classic hits. Delilah was discontinued on August 25, 2017, with evenings featuring more music.

On September 30, 2019, at 5PM, after playing "Addicted to Love" by Robert Palmer, KOAI changed its format from classic hits to a new format concept for baby boomers developed by veteran radio programmer John Sebastian.  It originally blended pop, rock, soul, and country from a seven-decade span and branded as "The Wow Factor". The first song on The Wow Factor was "Ride My See-Saw" by The Moody Blues.

References

External links
 The Wow Factor website

 
 

OAI